The 1996 FIRA Women's European Championship was the second edition of the Women's European Championship. It saw the debut of Germany and a five-nation event.

The competition was initially a three-team two pools system but Russia withdrew a few days before the start. With no time for finding substitutes Pool B was left with only two teams, becoming in a "semi-final" for deciding the final place. The other final place was decided on a three-team pool (Pool A), won by Spain with wins over Netherlands and Germany.

On the competition calendar 5th/6th and 3rd/4th place matches were planned, but with the non participation of Russia a three-team pool was created. Italy played Netherlands and Germany, the results of these games being combined with the earlier match between Netherlands and Germany to decide 3rd-5th places.

Results

Pool A

Pool B

3rd-5th play-offs

Final

See also
Women's international rugby

References

External links
FIRA website

1996
1996 rugby union tournaments for national teams
International women's rugby union competitions hosted by Spain
1995–96 in European women's rugby union
1995–96 in French rugby union
1995–96 in Italian rugby union
1996 in Spanish women's sport
1996 in Dutch women's sport
1996 in German women's sport
1996 in French women's sport
rugby union